Herpetological Monographs is a peer-reviewed scientific journal covering the zoology of amphibians and reptiles. It is published annually by the Herpetologists' League and was established in 1982. The League also publishes a quarterly peer-reviewed journal, Herpetologica. The editor-in-chief is Michael Harvey (Broward College, Florida). Previous editors include Todd Reeder (University of California, San Diego and Lee Fitzgerald (Texas A&M University). According to the Journal Citation Reports, the journal has a 2021 impact factor of 2.909.

References

External links 
 
 Herpetologists' League

Herpetology journals
Publications established in 1982
Annual journals
English-language journals
Academic journals published by non-profit organizations
1982 establishments in the United States